Garbiñe Muguruza defeated Anett Kontaveit in the final, 6–3, 7–5 to win the singles tennis title at the 2021 WTA Finals.

Ashleigh Barty was the reigning champion from when the event was last held in 2019, but withdrew to prioritize her recovery and prepare for the upcoming season.

Aryna Sabalenka, Barbora Krejčíková, Maria Sakkari, Iga Świątek, Paula Badosa, and Kontaveit made their singles debuts at the event.

Seeds

Alternates
Ons Jabeur, Naomi Osaka, Anastasia Pavlyuchenkova, and Elina Svitolina all qualified as alternates but withdrew before the start of the event.

Draw

Finals

Group Chichén Itzá

Group Teotihuacán

Standings are determined by: 1. number of wins; 2. number of matches; 3. in two-player ties, head-to-head records; 4. in three-player ties, (a) percentage of sets won (head-to-head records if two players remain tied), then (b) percentage of games won (head-to-head records if two players remain tied), then (c) WTA rankings.

References

External links
 Singles Draw
 Official website
 WTA website draw

2021 Singles
Finals